The Little Traitor is an independent family drama film written and directed by Lynn Roth.  Based on the novel Panther in the Basement by author, Amos Oz, the movie takes place in Palestine in 1947, just a few months before Israel becomes a state.

Starring Alfred Molina and featuring Theodore Bikel, this is a coming of age tale of the unlikely bond between a kind British soldier and a spirited Jewish boy set against the backdrop of the birth of the State of Israel.

Plot
The Little Traitor is set in 1947 Palestine, when the area still was ruled by the British, tells how 12-year-old Proffi (Ido Port) befriends the hated enemy, in the form of English Sgt. Dunlop (Alfred Molina), and sticks with him despite the suspicions of friends and family.

Cast
Alfred Molina as Sergeant Dunlop, a British Soldier
Ido Port as Avi Leibowitz, nicknamed ‘Proffy’
Rami Heuberger as Proffy's Father
Gilya Stern as Miriam, Proffy's Mother
Guy Krasner as Chita, Proffy's friend
Yonatan Lahat as Ben Hur, Proffy's friend
Boris Reinis as Chita's Father
Lior Sasson as Mr. Hochberg
Theodore Bikel as the Interrogator
Anat Klausner as Yardena, Proffy's Babysitter
Dafna Melzer as Rachel, Proffy's love interest

Production
The Little Traitor was a co-production between Evanstone films (Israel) and Panther Productions (US).  What appealed the most to writer/director Lynn Roth was sharing the story of a, “boy (who) finds himself caught between his hatred of "the British"—whom he dreams of destroying—and his growing affection for a member of the detested enemy.” 

On the third day of production, while filming in Jerusalem, war broke out between Israel and Lebanon.  Director Roth was afraid that after years of painstakingly putting together this film, it would all crumble in an afternoon, but the Israeli cast and crew insisted that the production go on.  When Alfred Molina’s representatives were intent on getting him out of the country, Molina casually responded, "What are you talking about? The movie is still shooting, and besides, I just had the best pita and hummus I've ever eaten in my life."

Release
The Little Traitor had a limited theatrical release and was distributed in the United States by Westchester Films.
It also had a theatrical release in Canada, Israel, Mexico and Costa Rica.  It was the longest running and highest-grossing film to date at the Movies of Delray theatre in Palm Beach County, Florida.

The movie was bought by Showtime for pay cable.
Warner Brothers purchased the movie for Video on Demand.

Awards & Festivals
Miami International Film Festival
Haifa International Film Festival
Palm Beach International Film Festival – Audience Choice Award for Best Feature Film
Palm Springs International Film Festival- Best of the Fest Award
Humanitas Prize – Nomination for Best Feature Film Screenplay 
Armenian International Film Festival for Children & Youth – Best Feature
Munich International Film Festival
AFI Dallas International Film Festival
Stockholm International Film Festival
Los Angeles Jewish Film Festival – Best Narrative Award 
Atlanta Jewish Film Festival - Audience Award for Best Narrative Feature
New York International Independent Film and Video Festival - Best Feature Award

Soundtrack
The Little Traitor original motion picture soundtrack was composed by Deborah Lurie and released on CD and iTunes in 2011.
Deborah Lurie is an American composer, producer and string arranger, well known for her musical work on Justin Bieber: Never Say Never, Dear John, 9, and the remake of Footloose.  As a string arranger, she contributed to the film musicals, Fame and Dreamgirls.

References

External links
 
 
 
 
 
 
 

2007 films
2007 drama films
Israeli independent films
American independent films
Amos Oz
Films based on Israeli novels
Films scored by Deborah Lurie
Films set in Mandatory Palestine
Films set in 1947
Israeli historical drama films
2000s American films